Elena Bouryka (born 29 July 1983 in Moscow) is a Russian-born actress who currently lives and works in Italy.

Filmography

Film 
 The Torturer, directed by Lamberto Bava (2005)
 Passo a due, directed by Andrea Barzini (2005)
 Notte prima degli esami, directed by Fausto Brizzi (2006)
 Agente matrimoniale, directed by Christian Bisceglia (2006)
 Ma l'amore... si, directed by Marco Costa and Tonino Zangardi (2006)
 Family Game, directed by Alfredo Arciero (2007)
 L'abbuffata, directed by Mimmo Calopresti (2007)
 Tutte le donne della mia vita, directed by Simona Izzo (2007)
 Lillo e Greg - The movie!, directed by Luca Rea (2007)
 E guardo il mondo da un oblò, directed by Stefano Calvagna (2007)
 Tris di donne e abiti nuziali, directed by Vincenzo Terracciano (2008)
 Le cose in te nascoste, directed by Vito Vinci (2008)
 Penso che un sogno così, directed by Marco De Luca (2008)
 Cartoline da Roma (Postcards from Rome), directed by Giulio Base (2008)
 Piede di Dio, directed by Luigi Sardiello (2009)
 Barbarossa, directed by Renzo Martinelli (2009)
 La soluzione migliore, directed by Luca Mazzieri (2009)
 Blood Red Karma, directed by Antonio Nardone

TV 
 La squadra 3, various directors - TV series (2002)
 Isolati (2003)
 Abasso il frollocone (2003/04)
 Stracult (2003/04/05/06/07)
 Bla bla bla (2005)
 Carabinieri 4, directed by Raffaele Mertes TV series (2005)
 Elisa di Rivombrosa, directed by Cinzia TH Torrini and Stefano Alleva - TV series (2005)
 L'ultimo rigore 2, directed by Sergio Martino - miniseries (2006)
 R.I.S. 2 - Delitti imperfetti - Episode: Testimone silenzioso, directed by Alexis Sweet - TV series (2006)
Moana, directed by Alfredo Peyretti - miniseries (2009)
 Io e mio figlio - Nuove storie per il commissario Vivaldi, directed by Luciano Odorisio - miniseries (2010)

Short subjects 
 Metti a fuoco alcune cose, directed by Fabrizio Finamore
 La voce del cuore, directed by Ugo Mangini
 Autostop, directed by Simone Bonacelli (2007)
 All Human Rights for All, directed by Giorgio Treves (2008)

References

Russian film actresses
Russian television actresses
Russian expatriates in Italy
Actresses from Moscow
1983 births
Living people
21st-century Russian actresses